Events in the year 1866 in Uruguay.

Incumbents
President: Venancio Flores

Events
May 2 - Paraguayan War: Battle of Estero Bellaco
July 18 - Battle of Boquerón (1866)
September 8 - establishment of Nuestra Señora del Carmen, Aguada, Montevideo
September 22 - Battle of Curupayty

Births

Deaths
July 18 - León de Pallejas, Spanish-born general, killed in action

 
1860s in Uruguay